Justice McAllister may refer to:

Archibald G. McAlister, associate justice of the Arizona Supreme Court
Thomas Francis McAllister, associate justice of the Michigan Supreme Court
William K. McAlister, associate justice of the Tennessee Supreme Court
William K. McAllister, associate justice of the Supreme Court of Illinois
William M. McAllister, associate justice of the Oregon Supreme Court